The 2010 Football Federation South Australia season was the 104th season of soccer in South Australia, and the fifth under the FFSA format.

2010 FFSA Super League

The 2010 South Australian Super League was the fifth edition of the South Australian Super League, the top level domestic association football competition in South Australia. 10 teams competed, all playing each other twice for a total of 18 rounds, with the top five at the end of the year qualifying for the finals system to determine 1st to 5th place. At the end of the season, the bottom two placed teams were relegated to the 2011 FFSA Premier League.

League table

Finals

2010 FFSA Premier League

The 2010 FFSA Premier League was the fifth edition of the FFSA Premier League as the second level domestic association football competition in South Australia. 10 teams competed, all playing each other twice for a total of 18 rounds, with the top five at the end of the year qualifying for the McIntyre final five finals system to determine 1st to 5th place. The League winners (Modbury) and Grand Final winners (Croydon) were promoted to the 2011 FFSA Super League, and the 9th and 10th placed teams were relegated to the 2011 FFSA State League.

League table

Finals

2010 FFSA State League

The 2010 FFSA State League was the fifth edition of the FFSA State League as the third level domestic association football competition in South Australia. 9 teams competed, all playing each other twice for a total of 16 rounds, with the top five at the end of the year qualifying for the McIntyre final five finals system to determine 1st to 5th place. The League winners and Grand Final winners were promoted to the 2011 FFSA Premier League.

League table

Finals

See also
2010 FFSA Premier League
2010 FFSA Super League
2010 FFSA State League
National Premier Leagues South Australia
Football Federation South Australia

References

2010 in Australian soccer
Football South Australia seasons